Inny may refer to
River Inny (disambiguation)
Inny Radebe (born 1995), South African rugby union player
Inny Junction railway station on the Dublin-Sligo railway line in Ireland
Inny Valley Railway in Cornwall, England